Hymenopodinae is a subfamily of the mantis family Hymenopodidae.

Tribes and genera
The Mantodea Species File lists genera in two tribes:

Anaxarchini
Anaxarcha Stal, 1877
Euantissa Giglio-Tos, 1927
Heliomantis Giglio-Tos, 1915
Nemotha Wood-Mason, 1884
Odontomantis Saussure, 1871
Werneriana Shcherbakov, Ehrmann & Borer, 2016 - monotypic W. latipennis (Werner, 1930)

Hymenopodini
subtribe Hymenopodina
Helvia (Stal, 1877) (synonym: Parymenopus (Wood-Mason, 1890))
Hymenopus (Serville, 1831)
Theopropus (Saussure, 1898)
subtribe Pseudocreobotrina
Chlidonoptera (Karsch, 1892)
Chloroharpax (Werner, 1908)
Creobroter (Westwood, 1889)
Panurgica (Karsch, 1896)
Pseudocreobotra (Saussure, 1870)

Now placed in family Galinthiadidae
Galinthias (Stal, 1877) (synonym Attalia (Uvarov, 1936))
Harpagomantis (Kirby, 1899)
Pseudoharpax (Saussure, 1870)

See also
List of mantis genera and species

References

Hymenopodidae
Mantodea subfamilies